is a Japanese football player who plays for Kamatamare Sanuki.

Playing career
Shimizu was born in Matsudo on September 18, 1981. After graduating from high school, he joined J1 League club Kashiwa Reysol based in his local Chiba Prefecture in 2000. Although he debuted in 2003 and several matches until April 2005, he could hardly play in the match behind Yuta Minami.

In April 2005, Shimizu moved to J2 League club Montedio Yamagata. Although he could not play at all in the match behind Shigeru Sakurai until October, he played last 5 matches in 2005 season. In 2006, he became a regular goalkeeper instead Sakurai. In 2008, Montedio won the 2nd place and was promoted to J1 first time in the club history. He played as regular goalkeeper and Montedio also remained in J1 until 2010. In 2011, however he lost his position behind Yuki Uekusa and the club results were bad. Although Shimizu became a regular goalkeeper again in July, Montedio finished at the bottom place and was relegated to J2 end of 2011 season. Although Shimizu played all 42 matches in 2012, he could not play many matches behind new player Satoshi Tokizawa in 2013 and Norihiro Yamagishi in 2014. Montedio was promoted to J1 end of 2014 season and won the 2nd place in 2014 Emperor's Cup.

In 2015, Shimizu moved to J2 club Kamatamare Sanuki. He became a regular goalkeeper. However the club results were bad every season and was relegated to J3 League end of 2018 season.

Club statistics

References

External links

1981 births
Living people
Association football people from Chiba Prefecture
Japanese footballers
J1 League players
J2 League players
J3 League players
Kashiwa Reysol players
Montedio Yamagata players
Kamatamare Sanuki players
Association football goalkeepers